Ummaidpur is a village in the Ahore tehsil of Jalore District of Rajasthan state in India. It is situated on the Jalore-Sanderao road (SH-16).

Demographics
Population of Ummaidpur is 1,532 according to census 2001. Where male population is 853 and the female population is 679.

References

 Ummaidpur Population
 Ummaidpur location

Villages in Jalore district